Iona Township is a township in Todd County, Minnesota, United States. The population was 416 at the 2000 census.

Iona Township was organized in 1881, and named after Iona, in Scotland.

Geography

Demographics
As of the census of 2000, there were 416 people, 140 households, and 106 families residing in the township.  The population density was 11.6 people per square mile (4.5/km2).  There were 155 housing units at an average density of 4.3/sq mi (1.7/km2).  The racial makeup of the township was 98.56% White, 0.48% African American, 0.24% Native American, 0.48% Asian, 0.24% from other races. Hispanic or Latino of any race were 1.68% of the population.

There were 140 households, out of which 38.6% had children under the age of 18 living with them, 71.4% were married couples living together, 0.7% had a female householder with no husband present, and 23.6% were non-families. 20.0% of all households were made up of individuals, and 8.6% had someone living alone who was 65 years of age or older.  The average household size was 2.97 and the average family size was  3.50.

In the township the population was spread out, with 31.0% under the age of 18, 8.4% from 18 to 24, 26.4% from 25 to 44, 20.2% from 45 to 64, and 13.9% who were 65 years of age or older.  The median age was 36 years. For every 100 females, there were 105.9 males.  For every 100 females age 18 and over, there were 120.8 males.

The median income for a household in the township was $39,167, and the median income for a family was $50,714. Males had a median income of $30,391 versus $22,813 for females. The per capita income for the township was $18,993.  About 4.4% of families and 7.7% of the population were below the poverty line, including 7.1% of those under age 18 and 12.5% of those age 65 or over.

References

Townships in Todd County, Minnesota
Townships in Minnesota